Government Medical College, Siddipet also Siddipet Medical College is a medical college located in Siddipet, Telangana. It received the permission from Medical Council of India in January 2018. The college is affiliated to Kaloji Narayana Rao University of Health Sciences.

History
The college was inaugurated on 3 June 2018. The construction was completed in a record time of  months. The MCI gave permission to 150 seats and started its first academic year in 2018-19. The college and hospital is spread over 50 acres, constructed at a cost of ₹700 crores.

Hospital
A 100-bed hospital in Siddipet was upgraded to a 300-bed facility, which will be part of the medical college. The facility has classrooms, laboratories and a library.

See also
Education in India
Literacy in India
List of institutions of higher education in Telangana
Medical Council of India

References

External links 
 

Educational institutions established in 2018
Medical colleges in Telangana
Siddipet district
2018 establishments in Telangana